Liangtian is a town under the administration of Zhenning Buyei and Miao Autonomous County, Guizhou, China. , it has two residential communities and 12 villages under its administration.

References 

Township-level divisions of Guizhou
Zhenning Buyei and Miao Autonomous County